John S. Gemperle (born September 8, 1982), better known as Papa Jackson and formerly Papa Jack, is a Filipino radio disc jockey and television personality. He is best known for his former, popular evening-to-late night radio programs TLC: True Love Conversations and Wild Confessions on 90.7 Love Radio Manila, which was simulcast on Love Radio stations nationwide. He is also the author of two books about love advice based on his program.

Early life and career
Gemperle came from a poor family in Alcala, Pangasinan. At the age of 10, he became a farmer, a hog raiser and a vendor. He joined and won a modeling contest while in his high school years before he went to Manila for his studies, and later graduated of mass communication course at the Polytechnic University of the Philippines.
 
While working as a call center agent, he would always listen to the program of Chris Tsuper and Nicole Hyala at 90.7 Love Radio. He later auditioned for the DJ search at the said station which he finally got hired and began his career under his persona known as "Papa Jack". In mid-2007, he started launching his love advice program TLC: True Love Conversations, which became one of the most popular radio shows until his departure from the station. In 2013, Papa Jack and then-Yes FM 101.1 (now 101.1 Yes The Best) DJ Chico Loco (Mark Jimel Gales) collaborated for their weekly program Gabi Na, Gising Na!, which lasted for 2 years.

He later ventured into television hosting, starting off with talk show Star Box, alongside Ali Sotto aired on GMA Network. In March 2015, he later became the host of his own program Call Me Papa Jack, which is based on his radio show TLC and it was aired on TV5.

He is also a brand endorser for Motorcycle store Motortrade, with rapper Gloc-9 and Julie Anne San Jose (formerly with Denise Barbacena).

On December 16, 2016, Papa Jack made his final broadcast of his nightly radio program, and eventually resigned as a DJ of 90.7 Love Radio. He did not cite complete details about his resignation. Prior to his final broadcast, his last co-host was DJ Kara Karinyosa (Klariz Magboo), whom both of them formed the "KarJack" tandem on-the-air.

On March 20, 2017, Papa Jack transferred to his new station, 106.7 Energy FM. He launched his new program, Hello... STG (Sorry, Thank You and Goodbye). The show initially ran every Monday to Friday from 9pm to 1am until inaugurating Gabi Na, Umaga Na! on Fridays with the return of erstwhile collaborator Mark Jimel Gales (who, by that point, assumed the name of Kuya Chico on May 8, 2017), and later joined by Kara (who moved to 106.7 Energy FM on February 6, 2019 after she was resigned from 90.7 Love Radio months ago).

He was initially named on air as "Papa J" until a month later when he was finally renamed as "Papa Jackson", to avert confusion with actor Jak Roberto and to avoid initiating trademark issues with the owner of 90.7 Love Radio, Manila Broadcasting Company, who held the rights to his former on-air name. He also served as the program manager of 106.7 Energy FM until November 2018 when he was promoted to station manager following significant listenership ratings gains.

Personal life
Aside from his work at Love Radio, he is also one of the instructors for mass communication students at Polytechnic University of the Philippines Manila, his alma mater. On weekends, he performs as a singer at Padi's Point.

On April 28, 2013, he married Toni Rose Maniago. The couple separated around 2016.

Filmography

TV

Radio
Gabi Na, Umaga Na! (106.7 Energy FM, 2017–present) – co-host with Gandang Kara
Hello... STG (Sorry, Thank You and Goodbye) (106.7 Energy FM, 2017–present) – host
TLC: True Love Conversations (90.7 Love Radio, 2007–2016) – host; later co-host with Kara Karinyosa
Wild Confessions (2007–2014; 2016)
The Letter (2012–2014)
TLC: The Drama Special Interactive (90.7 Love Radio and Yes FM 101.1 (now 101.1 Yes The Best), 2014–2016) – occasional voice actor
Gabi Na, Gising Na! (90.7 Love Radio and Yes FM 101.1 (now 101.1 Yes The Best), 2013–2015) – co-host with Chico Loco of Yes FM 101.1 (now 101.1 Yes The Best)

Authored books
 
  (also a give away for August 2015 FHM)

Awards

References

1982 births
Living people
Filipino radio personalities
Manila Broadcasting Company people
Polytechnic University of the Philippines alumni
People from Pangasinan
Filipino television talk show hosts
GMA Network personalities
TV5 (Philippine TV network) personalities